St Thomas More RC Academy is a coeducational Roman Catholic secondary school and sixth form located on Lynn Road (B1316) in North Shields, North Tyneside, England.

History
The school, which was known as St Anselm's before 1988, is a specialist maths and computing school and has been a DFES Training School since September 2000.

The school has seen only three head teachers since 1988, the former head teacher John Marshall retired in 2007, leaving Diane Donkin to become the new head from September 2007. Under her premiership, the school's name changed from St Thomas More High School to St Thomas More Academy in 2012. The school's name was then changed to St Thomas More RC High School in 2021.

In 2016, David Watson became the headteacher.

Notable alumni
 Adam Campbell professional footballer
 Ross Murray., Olympic 400m runner
 Brad Inman professional footballer.

Academic performance
It achieves results similar to a grammar school, with very high GCSE results and good A level results - the best for both in North Tyneside LEA, and in the top twenty schools in the North East at A level and for GCSE it is in the top five. From the most recent ofsted report. ofsted said it was "Outstanding" (For the past 18 years).

External links
 Official site
 School profile at Ofsted
 School profile at DFES
 Wikimapia

Catholic secondary schools in the Diocese of Hexham and Newcastle
Academies in the Metropolitan Borough of North Tyneside
North Shields
Educational institutions established in 1988
1988 establishments in England
Secondary schools in the Metropolitan Borough of North Tyneside